WSPY-FM (107.1 FM) is a radio station broadcasting an adult contemporary/full service format. Licensed to Plano, Illinois, United States, it serves the Fox Valley and Chicago's far west suburbs.  The call letters stand for S=Sandwich, P=Plano,Y=Yorkville- the three towns in the station's original listening area.

WSPY-FM 107.1 was founded by Larry and Pam Nelson. The first air date for WSPY-FM was on January 19, 1974, and has never been off the air. WSPY-FM covers high school sports, local news and events for the Fox Valley.

External links

Plano, Illinois
Radio stations established in 1974
1974 establishments in Illinois
Full service radio stations in the United States
Mainstream adult contemporary radio stations in the United States